Galveston Orphans Home, also known as Galveston Children's Home, was founded in 1878 by George Dealey (1829-1891) and moved to this location in Galveston, Texas in 1880. The original Gothic revival building was constructed from 1894-1895 with funding from Henry Rosenberg. It was destroyed by the storm of 1900 and newspaper publisher William Randolph Hearst hosted a charity bazaar at the Waldorf-Astoria Hotel in New York City to raise funds for a rebuild. It was completed in 1902. The building was listed on the National Register of Historic Places on March 21, 1979. It is located at 1315 21st Street.

See also

National Register of Historic Places listings in Galveston County, Texas
Recorded Texas Historic Landmarks in Galveston County

References

Further reading
Samuel Butler Graham and Ellen Newman, Galveston Community Book: A Historical and Biographical Record of Galveston and Galveston County (Galveston: Cawston, 1945). S. C. Griffin, History of Galveston, Texas (Galveston: Cawston, 1931). Marker Files, Texas Historical Commission, Austin.

External links

Buildings and structures in Galveston, Texas
National Register of Historic Places in Galveston County, Texas
Residential buildings on the National Register of Historic Places in Texas
Orphanages in the United States
Recorded Texas Historic Landmarks